Gounter is a surname. Notable people with the surname include:

Charles Gounter or Sir Charles Gounter Nicoll, (1703/4–1733), appointed Knight of the Order of the Bath
George Gounter ( 1646–1718), English politician, father of Charles